Milan Ferenčík may refer to:

 Milan Ferenčík (footballer, born 1991), Slovak footballer for SV Karlstetten/Neidling
 Milan Ferenčík (footballer, born 1995), Slovak footballer for MFK Ružomberok